The Konkan Kanya Express is superfast (earlier mail) of Indian Railways train running between Mumbai and Madgaon on the Konkan Railway route. This train operates daily, the Up Train number is 20111 (Mumbai to Madgaon) and the Down Train number 20112 (Madgaon to Mumbai).

Background
The train was among the first set of services launched in konkan railway when it was opened in 1998. This train service is very popular among the travellers of konkan region due to its convenient timings in the night. As a result the train is fully reserved months in advance and its tickets are rarely available without waiting list. The train used to run with conventional ICF coaches until June 2019, after which the new LHB were introduced. The services is operated by Konkan Railways. The train covers the  journey in about 13 hours 25 minutes. It is an important train link serving people along the coastal areas of Maharashtra and Goa. This train shares its rake with Mandovi Express.

Traction
As the Konkan Railway route has been completely electrified in 2022, the train is now hauled by a WAG5 or WAP4 or Bhusaval shed or WAP7 of Kalyan shed from Central Railway. Before electrification it was hauled by a WDP 4D of Kalyan or Pune shed of Central Railway and WDP 4, WDP4B/WDP4D of Krishnarajpuram or Huballi Shed of South Western Railway.

See also
Indian Railways
Konkan Railway

References

External links
 Konkan Railway
 
 Konkan Kanya Train Route Map
 http://indiarailinfo.com/train/949

Sister Trains
 Lokmanya Tilak Terminus - Karmali AC Superfast Express
 Dadar Madgaon Jan Shatabdi Express
 Mandovi Express
 Mumbai CST - Karmali Tejas Express
 Mumbai LTT - Madgaon AC Double Decker Express 

Transport in Mumbai
Transport in Margao
Named passenger trains of India
Konkan Railway
Rail transport in Maharashtra
Rail transport in Goa
Railway services introduced in 1998
Express trains in India